Strikeforce was an American mixed martial arts and kickboxing organization based in San Jose, California which operated from 1985 to 2013.  Live events and competitions debuted on November 7, 2009.

In early 2011, Strikeforce was purchased by American Ultimate Fighting Championship owner Zuffa, which eventually closed the promotion and brought the remaining fighter contracts into the UFC roster. 

Former Strikeforce employees are shown below in order by weight class.

Alumni

See also
 List of Strikeforce champions
 List of Strikeforce events

References

External links 
 Strikeforce on UFC Fight Pass

Lists of mixed martial artists
Strikeforce (mixed martial arts)·